Opogona bicolorella is a moth of the family Tineidae. It was described by Shōnen Matsumura in 1931. It is found in Japan and Taiwan.

References

Moths described in 1931
Opogona